The 1978 Milan Indoor, also known by its sponsored name Ramazzotti Cup, was a men's tennis tournament played on indoor carpet courts at the Palazzo dello Sport in Milan in Italy. The event was part WCT Tour which was incorporated into the 1978 Colgate-Palmolive Grand Prix circuit. It was the inaugural edition of the tournament and was held from 27 March through 2 April 1978. Second-seeded Björn Borg won the singles title. Total attendance for the tournament was 76,841.

Finals

Singles
 Björn Borg defeated  Vitas Gerulaitis 6–3, 6–3
 It was Borg's 4th singles title of the year and the 34th of his career.

Doubles
 José Higueras /  Victor Pecci defeated  Wojciech Fibak /  Raúl Ramírez 5–7, 7–6, 7–6

References

External links
 ITF edition tournament details

Milan
Milan Indoor
Milan Indoor
Milan Indoor
Milan Indoor